The Widow (Italian:La vedova) is a 1939 Italian drama film directed by Goffredo Alessandrini and starring Isa Pola, Leonardo Cortese and Osvaldo Valenti. A mother's possessive love for her dead son leads to a hostile attitude towards his widow.

Main cast
 Isa Pola as Maddalena 
 Leonardo Cortese as Carlo 
 Osvaldo Valenti as Padova, il pittore 
 Ruggero Ruggeri as Alessandro 
 Emma Gramatica as Adelaide, moglie di Alessandro 
 Cesco Baseggio as Anselmo 
 Nicola Maldacea as Gennarino 
 Cesare Zoppetti as Ogniben 
 Bice Parisi as Donna Clementina 
 Emi Rai as Gemma 
 Anna Capodaglio as Rosa 
 Vasco Creti as Il medico 
 Albino Principe as Mario

References

Bibliography 
 Reich, Jacqueline & Garofalo, Piero. Re-viewing Fascism: Italian Cinema, 1922-1943. Indiana University Press, 2002.

External links 
 

1939 films
Italian drama films
1939 drama films
1930s Italian-language films
Films directed by Goffredo Alessandrini
Italian films based on plays
Italian black-and-white films
1930s Italian films